Scopula hypochra is a moth of the  family Geometridae. It is found from Australia (Queensland) and Norfolk Island to Japan.

References

Moths described in 1888
hypochra
Moths of Asia
Moths of Oceania